Tuli (also Romanized as Tūlī; also known as Talū) is a village in Dasht Rural District, Silvaneh District, Urmia County, West Azerbaijan Province, Iran. At the 2006 census, its population was 621, in 103 families.

References 

Populated places in Urmia County